Wurmbea calcicola, also known as Naturaliste Nancy, is a species of plant in the Colchicaceae family that is endemic to Australia. It is classified as Endangered under Australia's EPBC Act.

Description
The species is a cormous perennial herb that grows to a height of 25 cm. Its white to pink flowers appear in June.

Distribution and habitat
The species has a limited range in the vicinity of Cape Naturaliste, in the Jarrah Forest IBRA bioregion of south-western Western Australia. It grows in loam soils on limestone cliffs.

References

calcicola
Monocots of Australia
Angiosperms of Western Australia
Plants described in 1993
Taxa named by Terry Desmond Macfarlane